Joseph or Joe Howard may refer to:

Entertainment
 Joseph E. Howard (1870–1961), American composer and vaudeville performer
 Joseph Kinsey Howard (1906–1951), American writer
 Joseph Howard (writer) (born 1957), pseudonym for American writer Paul Rudnick
 Joe Howard (actor) (born 1948), American actor
 Joseph Howard (Oz), fictional character in the TV show Oz

Politics
 Joseph Howard (Prime Minister) (1862–1925), prime minister of Malta
 Joseph Howard (British politician) (1834–1923), English barrister and Conservative politician
 Joseph Howard (judge) (1800–1877), Justice of the Maine Supreme Judicial Court

Sports
 Joseph Howard (cricketer) (1871–1951), English cricketer
 Joseph Howard (golfer) (1878-1908), American golfer
 Joe Howard (sledge hockey) (born 1966), American ice sledge hockey player
Joseph H. H. Howard (martial artist) (1985) Karate, Taekwondo, Muay Thai

Other
 Joseph Howard (fur trader) (died 1797), merchant from Montreal
 Joseph C. Howard Sr. (1922–2000), American judge for the US Court for the District of Maryland
 Joseph H. Howard (1912–1994), oral surgeon and drum collector
 Joseph Jackson Howard (1827–1902), English genealogist
 Joe Howard Jr. (1833–1908), American journalist